Bloom Township is one of the fourteen townships of Morgan County, Ohio, United States.  The 2000 census found 1,015 people in the township.

Geography
Located in the northern part of the county, it borders the following townships:
Blue Rock Township, Muskingum County - north
Meigs Township, Muskingum County - northeast corner
Bristol Township - east
Morgan Township - south
Malta Township - southwest, east of Deerfield Township
Deerfield Township - southwest, west of Malta Township
York Township - west
Harrison Township, Muskingum County - northwest

No municipalities are located in Bloom Township.

Name and history
Statewide, other Bloom Townships are located in Fairfield, Scioto, Seneca, and Wood counties.

Government
The township is governed by a three-member board of trustees, who are elected in November of odd-numbered years to a four-year term beginning on the following January 1. Two are elected in the year after the presidential election and one is elected in the year before it. There is also an elected township fiscal officer, who serves a four-year term beginning on April 1 of the year after the election, which is held in November of the year before the presidential election. Vacancies in the fiscal officership or on the board of trustees are filled by the remaining trustees.

As of 2007, the trustees are Michael Gibeaut, Stanley Hopkins, and Carl Work, and the clerk is Trudy Massey.

References

External links
County website
Morgan County Historical Pictures

Townships in Morgan County, Ohio
Townships in Ohio